The peninsular myotis (Myotis peninsularis) is a species of vesper bat. It is endemic to northwestern Mexico, found only within Baja California Sur state on the southern Baja California Peninsula.  Its habitats include the southern Peninsular Ranges and deserts.

Taxonomy and etymology
It was first encountered in August 1896 by Loye H. Miller.
It was described by Gerrit Smith Miller Jr. in 1898.
It was previously considered a subspecies of the cave myotis, Myotis velifer.
Its species name peninsularis is Latin in origin, meaning "of or connected with a peninsula."

Description

Range and habitat
It is only found in southern Baja California.

Conservation
It is currently listed as endangered by the IUCN.
Threats to this species tourist activities.

References

Mouse-eared bats
Bats of Mexico
Endemic mammals of Mexico
Endemic fauna of the Baja California Peninsula
Natural history of Baja California Sur
Natural history of the Peninsular Ranges
Mammals described in 1898
Taxa named by Gerrit Smith Miller Jr.
Endangered biota of Mexico
Endangered fauna of North America
Taxonomy articles created by Polbot